The 1945–46 Drexel Dragons men's basketball team represented Drexel Institute of Technology during the 1945–46 men's basketball season. The Dragons, led by 1st year head coach John McNally, played their home games at Curtis Hall Gym and were members of the Southern division of the Middle Atlantic States Collegiate Athletic Conference (MASCAC).

Roster

Schedule

|-
!colspan=9 style="background:#F8B800; color:#002663;"| Regular season
|-

References

Drexel Dragons men's basketball seasons
Drexel
1945 in sports in Pennsylvania
1946 in sports in Pennsylvania